Hermesianax was a Greek masculine name. 
Notable people with this name were: 
 Hermesianax (poet), an elegiac poet from Colophon
 Hermesianax of Tralles, his three daughters were champions and he erected a monument at Delphi for them 
 Hermesianax, a wrestler from Colophon
 Hermesianax, a historian from Cyprus